Ettore Balestrero (21 December 1966) is an Italian prelate of the Catholic Church who serves as the Apostolic Nunicio to the Democratic Republic of the Congo. He previously served as Nuncio to Colombia and in Rome at the Secretariat of State as Undersecretary for Relations with States. He entered the diplomatic service of the Holy See in 1996 and was made an archbishop in 2013.

Biography
Balestrero was born in Genoa on 21 December 1966; his mother was an American. After attending law school, he entered the Almo Collegio Capranica and was ordained a priest on 18 September 1993 for the Diocese of Rome by Cardinal Camillo Ruini. He earned a degree in theology and a doctorate in Canon Law. After serving in the Parish of Santa Maria Mater Ecclesiae al Torrino, he became a student at the Pontifical Ecclesiastical Academy.

He entered the Holy See's diplomatic service in 1996 and held positions in Korea, Mongolia and the Netherlands. Beginning in 2001 he served in the Secretariat of State. On 17 August 2009, Pope Benedict XVI appointed him Undersecretary for Relations with States, replacing Pietro Parolin who was named Apostolic Nuncio to Venezuela the same day.

Balestrero speaks fluent English as well as French, Spanish, German and Dutch.

As Undersecretary, Balestrero was the Vatican's representative to Moneyval, the arm of the Council of Europe charged with the prevention of money laundering and the financing of terrorism. Moneyval's July 2016 assessment showed the Vatican had substantially improved its compliance, though it identified ongoing problems as well. Balestrero accepted its judgements and said the report was "not an end, but a milestone in our continuing efforts ... an important passage in our continuing efforts to marry moral commitments to technical excellence.

On 22 February 2013, in the last week of the papacy of Pope Benedict XVI, Balestrero was appointed apostolic nuncio to Colombia and Titular Archbishop of Vittoriana. He received his episcopal consecration from Cardinal Tarcisio Bertone on 27 April.  In Colombia he supported the government's entente with the FARC guérilla movement and the peace agreement reached in November 2016, leading to a papal visit to Colombia in 2017.

Early in 2018, the Apostolic Nuncio to the Democratic Republic of the Congo (DRC), Archbishop  Luis Mariano Montemayor, returned to Rome after being declared persona non grata for his criticisms of DRC President Joseph Kabila.  On 6 July, the Holy See sent Balestrero to the nunciature in the DRC to resolve its affairs (per il disbrigo degli affari), though he was not given a title in the nunciature.

On 27 April 2019, after elections and a change of government in the DRC, Pope Francis named Balestrero apostolic nuncio to the DRC.

Notes

See also
 List of heads of the diplomatic missions of the Holy See

References

External links

1966 births
Living people
Almo Collegio Capranica alumni
21st-century Italian Roman Catholic titular archbishops
Pontifical Ecclesiastical Academy alumni
Italian people of American descent
Clergy from Genoa
Apostolic Nuncios to Colombia
Apostolic Nuncios to the Democratic Republic of the Congo